is one of the 7 wards of the city of Kawasaki in Kanagawa Prefecture, Japan. As of November 2014, the ward had an estimated population of 244,565 and a density of 16,637 persons per km². The total area was 14.70 km².

Geography
Nakahara Ward is located in eastern Kanagawa Prefecture, in the center portion of the city of Kawasaki, bordering on Tokyo to the north and Yokohama to the south.

Surrounding municipalities
Saiwai-ku, Kawasaki
Takatsu-ku, Kawasaki
Setagaya-ku, Tokyo
Ōta-ku, Tokyo
Kōhoku-ku, Yokohama

History
Archaeologists have found numerous Kofun period remains at numerous locations in what is now Nakahara-ku, indicating a long period of human settlement. Under the Nara period Ritsuryō system, it became part of Tachibana District Musashi Province. In the Edo period, it was administered as tenryō territory controlled directly by the Tokugawa shogunate, but administered through various hatamoto. After the Meiji Restoration, the area was divided into Nakahawa Village and Sumiyoshi Village within Tachibana District in the new Kanagawa Prefecture on April 1, 1889. The two villages merged in 1925 to form the town of Nakahara. The town was annexed by the neighboring city of Kawasaki in August 1933. In April 1972, the area became Nakahara Ward with the division of the city of Kawasaki into wards.

Economy
Nakahara Ward is largely a regional commercial center and bedroom community for central Kawasaki and Tokyo. The Ward hosts Fujitsu's Main Branch at Kamikodanaka 4-chome in Nakahara-ku. It was formerly Fujitsu's world headquarters. Other industries include factories operated by Mitsubishi Fuso and NEC.

Transportation

Railway
JR East – Nambu Line
  -  -  -  - 
JR East – Yokosuka Line
 Musashi-Kosugi Station,
 Tokyu Corporation – Tōkyū Tōyoko Line / Tōkyū Meguro Line
 -  - 
The Tōkaidō Shinkansen passes through Nakahara-ku but do not stop.

Highway
 National Route 466 (No. 3 Keihin Road, as )
Kanagawa Prefectural Road 2
Kanagawa Prefectural Road 14
Kanagawa Prefectural Road 45
Kanagawa Prefectural Road 111

Local attractions
Todoroki Athletics Stadium

Education

Nippon Medical School – Shin-Maruko Campus

Municipal junior high schools:

 Gyokusen (玉川中学校)
 Hirama (平間中学校)
 Ida (井田中学校)
 Imai (今井中学校)
 Miyauchi (宮内中学校)
 Nakahara (中原中学校)
 Nishi Nakahara (西中原中学校)
 Sumiyoshi (住吉中学校)

Municipal elementary schools:

 Gyokusen (玉川小学校)
 Higashi Sumiyoshi (東住吉小学校)
 Hirama (平間小学校)
 Ida (井田小学校)
 Imai (今井小学校)
 Kami Maruko (上丸子小学校)
 Kariyado (苅宿小学校)
 Kizuki (木月小学校)
 Kosugi (小杉小学校)
 Miyauchi (宮内小学校)
 Nakahara (中原小学校)
 Nishi Maruko (西丸子小学校)
 Ogayato (大谷戸小学校)
 Oto (大戸小学校)
 Shimogawara (下河原小学校)
 Shimokodanaka (下小田中小学校)
 Shimonumabe (下沼部小学校)
 Shinjo (新城小学校)
 Sumiyoshi (住吉小学校)

References

External links
 Nakahawa Ward Office

Wards of Kawasaki, Kanagawa